O. Abdurahman is an Indian journalist and author from Kerala. He is the group editor of Madhyamam Daily-Mediaone, and has authored books on Islam and issues facing the Muslim community in India.

Early life
He did his initial studies at Al Madrasathul Islamiya Chennamangalore (1960–64) and Shanthapuram Islamiya collage. Later he moved to Qatar  and pursued his higher studies at the Al Ma'had ul Deen, Qatar University, Qatar (1972–74). He then moved back to India and joined the Chennamagalore Islahiya College as its Principal in 1982.

Public life

Journalist and orator
Abdurrahman is the editor of Madhyamam Daily, a Malayalam newspaper. He was the editor of Prabodhanam weekly during the period 1964–72.
He writes on Islam, minority politics, communal politics, education and media in various periodicals, journals and magazines. Abdulrahman is an activist of Jamaat-e-Islami Hind who is known for his speeches on different topics at various seminars, public meetings.
He is a member of Board of Studies, Journalism Department, University of Calicut and General Council, Kerala Press Academy.

Social and educational activist
He was a member of Kerala Government Arabic Textbook Committee. He served as a member of the 15-member expert committee led by Dr. KN Panikker to advise the Government on the controversial Seventh Standard Social Sciences Textbook syllabus.

References

1944 births
Living people
20th-century Indian Muslims
People from Kozhikode district
Malayalam-language journalists
Malayali people
Indian editors
Journalists from Kerala
20th-century Indian journalists
Indian male journalists
Qatar University alumni